Margaret M. McChesney was the first female lawyer to appear before the full bench of the Massachusetts Supreme Judicial Court.

Personal life and education
McChesney was graduated from the Portia School of Law in 1921. She was from Boston and Quincy Massachusetts.

Legal career

McChesney became the first female lawyer to appear before the full bench of the Massachusetts Supreme Judicial Court in 1926 when she represented a client charged with drunk driving. In 1931, she was admitted to the bar in federal courts. She was "one of the most successful lawyers in Boston."

She was a member of Phi Delta Delta. McChesney also taught law at Portia Law School.

See also

List of first women lawyers and judges in Massachusetts

References

People from Quincy, Massachusetts
Lawyers from Boston
20th-century American lawyers
Year of birth missing
Year of death missing
20th-century American women lawyers